Hovsjö is a neighborhood located in the city of Södertälje in Stockholm County, Sweden.

History
Hovsjö was built between 1971 and 1975, at the tail end of the Million Programme to house the laborers moving to Södertälje to work at Astra Zeneca and Scania AB, who were major employers in the area. Currently there are around 2,200 housing units with a blend of high density apartment buildings as well as lower density rowhouses.

Currently there are approximate 5,000–6,000 residents in Hovsjö, with high percentage of residents of non-Swedish ethnic background. Main ethnic groups represented are Assyrian people, Finns, and Armenians.

References 

1971 establishments in Sweden
Neighbourhoods in Sweden
Populated places in Stockholm County